The Pipmuacan Reservoir is a man-made lake on the boundary of the Saguenay–Lac-Saint-Jean and Côte-Nord regions of Quebec, Canada, about  north of Chicoutimi. It is used to control the flow for downstream hydro-electric generating stations on the Betsiamites River and, through Lake Pamouscachiou, also on the Shipshaw River.

The reservoir is shaped highly irregularly, with many deep bays, dotted with islands in its western section, and characterized by a large rounded peninsula in the centre. Primary tributaries are the Betsiamites, Sylvestre, Hirondelles, and Pipmuacan Rivers.

The reservoir is named after Lake Pipmuacan that was flooded during the formation of the reservoir. The name is of Innu origin, that may mean "arrow". The Geographic Board reported in 1960 that "according to the missionaries of the Côte-Nord, the Innu had given this name to the lake in remembrance of their last fight with the Iroquois on Mount Pigmaugan (Pipmuacan) that overlooks the water." Other spelling variations before standardization include Pipmuakan, Pipmaugan, and Pipmakan.

The sport fish found in Pipmuacan Reservoir are northern pike, lake trout, brook trout, and lake whitefish. Outfitters provide fishing excursions and accommodations at the reservoir.

History
The Pipmuacan Reservoir was formed in October 1953 when Hydro-Québec began construction on the dams and power plant of Bersimis-1. The reservoir's spillway was cut through a mountain between the two dams. By 1956, the construction work was completed.

In 2002, Hydro-Québec diverted part of the Portneuf River to the north into the Pipmuacan Reservoir to increase the capacity of the Bersimis power stations. The partial diversion of the Sault aux Cochons River is being studied to further optimize the operation of the existing stations.

References

External links
 "Giant of the North" Popular Mechanics, December 1943, article on the crash program to create the Shipshaw hydroelectric project

Lakes of Côte-Nord
Reservoirs in Quebec
Lakes of Saguenay–Lac-Saint-Jean